Gary Gibson may refer to:
 Gary Gibson (author) (born 1965), Scottish science fiction author
 Gary Gibson (American football) (born 1982), American football defensive tackle
 Sidney Sloane (born 1967), né Gary Gibson, TV presenter